New Wave  may refer to various artistic movements in film, music and literature. These include:

Movements in film
 The New Wave, French New Wave, or Nouvelle Vague, the inaugural New Wave cinema movement
 Australian New Wave
 Indian New Wave, or Parallel cinema
 Japanese New Wave, or Nuberu Bagu, which also developed around the same time as the French Nouvelle Vague
 Persian New Wave, or Iranian New Wave, started in the 1960s
 New German Cinema, new wave of German cinema
 New Nigerian Cinema, also known as Nigerian New Wave
 Czechoslovak New Wave
 Cinema Novo or Novo Cinema, a movement in Brazilian and Portuguese film
 Hong Kong New Wave, a movement in Hong Kong film led by Tsui Hark
 Philippine New Wave, also known as Filipino New Wave or Contemporary Philippine Cinema
 Romanian New Wave
 British New Wave
 Taiwan New Wave
 Thai New Wave
 Toronto New Wave
 New Hollywood, also known as the American New Wave
 New generation (Malayalam film movement), new wave of Indian Malayalam cinema
 Mexican ('Nuevo Cine Mexicano')

Movements in music
 Bossa nova ("new wave" in Portuguese), a genre of Brazilian music
 New wave music, in the United Kingdom, the United States and various enclaves in the late 1970s and through the 1980s
 New wave of British heavy metal
 New wave of American heavy metal
 Neue Deutsche Welle, the German new wave music movement in the late 1970s and early 1980s
 Yugoslav new wave, aka Novi val, Novi talas or Nov bran, the new wave scene in Yugoslavia in the late 1970s and early 1980s
 Nueva ola, a form of Spanish language popular music inspired on the musical developments of US and Europe in the 1950s and 1960s
 Onda Nueva, a type of Venezuelan jazz/classical music, founded by Aldemaro Romero

Movements in literature
 New Wave science fiction, a movement in the 1960s and 1970s

Multidisciplinary movements 

 Ukrainian New Wave

See also 

 List of art movements